Tournon-Saint-Pierre is a commune in the Indre-et-Loire department in central France.

Population

Sights
The Château des Vallées is located in Tournon-Saint-Pierre.

See also
Communes of the Indre-et-Loire department

References

External links

Official site (in French)

Communes of Indre-et-Loire